The Superstar Effect or "Tiger Woods effect" refers to the change in performance caused by the presence of a highly ranked player - a superstar - in a rank-order competition.

Overview 
The phenomenon was first described in a study titled "Quitters Never Win: The (Adverse) Incentive Effects of Competing with Superstars" by Jennifer Brown, which examined the performance of golfers at events with and without Tiger Woods. In contradiction to what intuition would suggest (namely that increased rivalry encourages better performance), Brown finds that the presence of a superstar is in fact associated with reduced competitor’s efforts in rank-order tournaments. The explanation she provides is an economic model in which competing is costly - one might hurt themselves, for instance - thus when the chance of winning is very low, the participant is discouraged from performing to her best abilities as it is not worthwhile.

The study uses data from the Professional Golfers' Association (PGA) that contains round-by-round scores for all players in every tournament from 1999 to 2006 and hole-by-hole results for all events from 2002 to 2006. During this period, golfer Tiger Woods was performing significantly better than any other player with scores in regular and major events being lower than the group mean in all years except 2004. His consistent and dominant performance has earned him the title of superstar. Hence, the data is filtered creating a subset of tournaments Tiger Woods was a part of and other players’ performance is compared to when they are competing against Woods to when they are not. The analysis yields that on events when the highly skilled golfers were competing against Tiger Woods, their performance was considerably worse - with scores almost one stroke higher on average - than on events where Tiger Woods was absent. On the other hand, lower-ranked golfers are less or not at all affected by his presence. Brown notes that this could be due to the fact that the stakes are not as high for lower-ranked golfers to start with.

Brown investigates the possibility of other explanations as to why golfers’ performance is poorer but finds that it is neither due to players taking more risks nor is the other players’ performance worse relative to Woods’ due to the fact that better golfers avoid competitions the superstar would be their opponent in. She also disperses the idea that it would be the increased media attention attributed to Woods’ presence that causes other players to produce lower results.

Finally, Brown notes that superstars must in fact be in their ‘super’ stage of career to be able to create an adverse effect: in periods where Tiger Woods was not that successful (in years 2003-2004) golfers actually seem to have played better against him.

Further research 

Three years after Brown’s study, in 2010, a similar one was conducted in Japan by Ryuichi Tanaka and Kazutoshi Ishino. The writers look at how the presence of Japan golfer superstar Kazuo Ozaki affects the game of others and their findings are in accordance with those of the paper on Woods. Their results suggest that when having to compete against Ozaki, players perform worse by about 0.3 strokes on average.

Yet another research, published by Brian C. Hill in 2014, examines the same effect in 100-meter tournaments with Usain Bolt being the superstar on the field. Surprisingly, Hill finds a positive superstar effect, meaning that runners produce faster running times and the likelihood of setting a personal record is increased. Wanting to explain the results seemingly contradictory to that of Brown’s, Hill points out the simultaneous nature of running competitions (whereas in golf, players get to watch each other) and that a 100-meter race is about 10 seconds which does not leave competitors much time to alter their behaviour because of Bolt.

Relevance in management 

The importance of studying the dynamics of rank-order tournaments with heterogeneous competitors reaches beyond the world of sports. Numerous management strategies use competition as an incentive for better productivity, however, according to the superstar effect, if agents are to rival a superstar, they may in fact reduce their efforts.

Impact on ratings and attendance 
Superstars have a much wider impact than only the change in performance caused by the presence of a superstar. In the NBA, superstars lead to higher attendance at games in addition to higher television ratings for games in which a superstar plays. This leads to an increase in revenue for both the team which the superstar plays for, and the opposing team.

The Effect of Superstars on Game Attendance: Evidence From the NBA, a research paper written by Brad Humphreys and Candon Johnson, utilizes data collected on game attendance from the 1981 season through the 2013-2014 season to analyze the effect which superstar players in the NBA have on attendance. The study shows a significant effect on game attendance and television ratings in the NBA when a superstar is playing. The results indicate that several superstar players lead to a significant increase in attendance at both home and away games. These players include LeBron James, Dwight Howard, Shaquille O’Neal, and Michael Jordan, who had the largest impact with nearly 5000 additional fans at home games, and over 4200 at away games. The findings of another research paper titled Stars at the Gate: The Impact of Star Power on NBA Gate Revenues, further support this conclusion. The paper highlights that star power increases the demand which fans have for the NBA. It also points out that to truly measure the impact which the superstar effect has on revenues, the impact on away attendance must be measured as well. This supports the conclusion reached by Humphreys and Johnson.

Superstars in the National Basketball Association: Economic Value and Policy, a research paper written by Jerry Hausman and Gregory Leonard, analyzes television ratings, merchandise sales and game attendance to determine the economic value of superstars in the NBA. The study determines that Michael Jordan was worth over $50 million to other teams in the NBA. In addition to Jordan, superstars such as Magic Johnson and Larry Bird also had a large impact on attendance in games which they played. The final results of the study determine that when a superstar plays in a game, this creates positive externalities for the opposing team. This is due to the team receiving benefits which they are not paying for.

Examples of the effect which superstars have on attendance and television ratings are not limited to the NBA. Another prevalent example is within the PGA Tour. The research paper Superstars, Uncertainty of Outcome, and PGA Tour Television Ratings, finds that ratings for the PGA Tour are driven primarily by stars. This is more clearly shown using the 2014 US Open as an example. Martin Kaymer dominated the tournament, however television ratings were shockingly low. The study compares this to Tiger Woods dominant win at the 2000 US Open, where he was victorious by 15 strokes. Although it was evident that Woods would win the tournament, ratings were much higher than they were in 2014. This shows the presence of a superstar effect in golf, especially when Tiger Woods is competing. In the conducted research variables indicating the presence of Tiger Woods and Phil Mickelson were statistically significant, whereas variables showing how much the leader is ahead, and the total number of competitors was not significant, further showing that stars are the true driving factor for ratings on the PGA Tour.

References 

Golf in the United States
Social psychology concepts
Sports psychology
Sports terminology